The 2009 BWF World Championships was the 17th tournament of the World Badminton Championships. It was held at the Gachibowli Indoor Stadium in Hyderabad, Andhra Pradesh, India, from 10 to 16 August 2009. Following the results of the mixed doubles.

Seeds

 Lee Yong-dae / Lee Hyo-jung (semi-final)
 Nova Widianto / Liliyana Natsir (final)
 Zheng Bo / Ma Jin (quarter-final)
 He Hanbin / Yu Yang (quarter-final)
 Xie Zhongbo / Zhang Yawen (quarter-final)
 Joachim Fischer Nielsen / Christinna Pedersen (semi-final)
 Thomas Laybourn / Kamilla Rytter Juhl (champion)
 Valiyaveetil Diju / Jwala Gutta (quarter-final)
 Sudket Prapakamol / Saralee Thungthongkam (withdrew)
 Yohan Hadikusumo Wiratama / Chau Hoi Wah (third round)
 Anthony Clark / Donna Kellogg (withdrew)
 Robert Mateusiak / Nadieżda Kostiuczyk (third round)
 Songphon Anugritayawon / Kunchala Voravichitchaikul (withdrew)
 Xu Chen / Zhao Yunlei (third round)
 Yoo Yeon-seong / Kim Min-jung (third round)
 Devin Lahardi Fitriawan / Lita Nurlita (third round)

Main stage

Section 1

Section 2

Section 3

Section 4

Final stage

External links 
Results

Mixed doubles
World Championships